John Allen Daviau (June 14, 1942 – April 15, 2020) was an American cinematographer known for his collaborations with Steven Spielberg on E.T. the Extra-Terrestrial (1982), The Color Purple (1985), and Empire of the Sun (1987). He received five Academy Award nominations and two British Academy Film Award nominations, with one win. In addition to his work in film, Daviau served as Cinematographer-in-Residence at  UCLA.

Career 
Daviau was born on June 14, 1942, in New Orleans, and raised in Los Angeles. He graduated from Loyola High School in 1960.

He was introduced to Steven Spielberg in the late 1960s and the two went on to work together on two early short films. They continued their professional working career by collaborating on E.T. the Extra-Terrestrial (1982); "Kick the Can," a segment from Twilight Zone: The Movie (1983), The Color Purple (1985), an episode of the NBC anthology series Amazing Stories titled "Ghost Train" (1985), and Empire of the Sun (1987).

Daviau's work also includes John Schlesinger's The Falcon and the Snowman (1985), the Spielberg-produced Harry and the Hendersons (1987), Albert Brooks' Defending Your Life (1991), Barry Levinson's Avalon (1990) and Bugsy (1991), Peter Weir's Fearless (1993), Frank Marshall's Congo (1995), Rand Ravich's The Astronaut's Wife (1999) and Stephen Sommers' Van Helsing (2004), his final feature.

He received lifetime achievement awards from the Art Directors Guild in 1997 and the American Society of Cinematographers in 2007.

Daviau shot thousands of commercials, documentaries, industrials and educational films, and created psychedelic special-effects lighting for Roger Corman's The Trip (1967) before he gained entry into the International Photographers Guild.

E.T. the Extra-Terrestrial
While doing a lawnmower commercial in Arizona, Daviau learned that Spielberg was looking for a cinematographer for E.T. and sent the director a tape of The Boy Who Drank Too Much, a 1980 telefilm that he shot. "It had a lot of mood, and it's about kids, so I knew Steven would watch it!" Daviau said. Spielberg stated that he contacted Daviau for his next feature, saying, "I did something I rarely do. I didn't think twice; I picked up the phone and asked Allen if he would photograph my next feature."

Personal life and death 
Following a surgical procedure in 2012, Daviau was confined to a wheelchair. He died on April 15, 2020, at the age of 77, as a result of complications from COVID-19 at the Motion Picture & Television Country House and Hospital.

Filmography
Short films

Film

Television

Awards and nominations

Academy Awards

BAFTA Awards

American Society of Cinematographers

Other awards

References

External links
 

1942 births
2020 deaths
American cinematographers
Artists from New Orleans
Art Center College of Design people
Best Cinematography BAFTA Award winners
Deaths from the COVID-19 pandemic in California
Wheelchair users